The Great American Bash is a professional wrestling event currently produced by WWE, a professional wrestling promotion based in Connecticut. Created by Dusty Rhodes, the event was established in 1985 and was originally produced by the National Wrestling Alliance's (NWA) Jim Crockett Promotions (JCP). In 1988, it began broadcasting on pay-per-view (PPV), and later that same year, JCP was rebranded as World Championship Wrestling (WCW), which seceded from the NWA in January 1991. 

In March 2001, the then-World Wrestling Federation (WWF) purchased WCW. In May 2002, the WWF was renamed to World Wrestling Entertainment (WWE) and the promotion revived The Great American Bash as their own annual PPV in 2004. It was held exclusively for WWE's SmackDown brand from 2004 to 2006 before brand-exclusive PPVs were discontinued in April 2007. In 2009, WWE renamed the event as The Bash, which was also the final Great American Bash broadcast on PPV, as it was replaced by Fatal 4-Way in 2010. 

The Great American Bash returned in July 2012 under its original full name and was held as a special live episode of SmackDown. In July 2020, the event name was again revived and has since been held as an annual event for WWE's NXT brand, airing as special episodes of NXT.

History
The Great American Bash was invented by Dusty Rhodes, a prominent wrestler of the National Wrestling Alliance (NWA), who became a wrestler and booker of the NWA's Jim Crockett Promotions (JCP). The first Great American Bash event was held by JCP on July 6, 1985, in Charlotte, North Carolina at the American Legion Memorial Stadium. In 1986 and 1987, The Great American Bash was held as a series of events. The Great American Bash continued to be broadcast on closed-circuit television until the 1988 event, which was the first to be broadcast on pay-per-view (PPV). In November that year, JCP was purchased by Turner Broadcasting System and JCP was rebranded as World Championship Wrestling (WCW).

WCW continued to produce The Great American Bash under the NWA banner until WCW seceded from the NWA in January 1991. As such, the 1991 event was the first Great American Bash produced by WCW alone. After the 1992 event, WCW did not hold the PPV again until 1995. It then continued annually until 2000. The 2000 event was the final Great American Bash held by WCW, as in March 2001, WCW was purchased by the World Wrestling Federation (WWF), which was renamed to World Wrestling Entertainment (WWE) in May 2002.

After a four-year hiatus, the event was revived by WWE in 2004. To coincide with the brand extension, where the promotion divided its roster into brands where wrestlers were exclusively assigned to perform, the 2004 event was held exclusively for the SmackDown! brand. It continued to be held exclusively for SmackDown! in 2005 and 2006. Following WrestleMania 23 in April 2007, brand-exclusive PPVs were discontinued, thus the events from 2007 to 2009 featured the Raw, SmackDown!, and ECW brands. In 2009, the event was renamed as The Bash. It would be the only held under this name, as well as the last held on PPV, as the event was replaced by Fatal 4-Way in 2010.

In April 2011, WWE ceased using its full name with the WWE abbreviation becoming an orphaned initialism.  WWE then revived The Great American Bash in July 2012 under the event's original full name. This event was held as a special episode of SmackDown. After another eight years, WWE again revived the event, this time for the NXT brand as a two-part special episode of NXT. The event was scheduled to again be held as a special episode of NXT in 2021, thus becoming an annual event for NXT.

Events

1985

The 1985 Great American Bash was the inaugural Great American Bash professional wrestling event produced by the NWA's Jim Crockett Promotions. It took place on July 6, 1985, at the American Legion Memorial Stadium in Charlotte, North Carolina. The event included a 1-hour live concert performance by David Allan Coe.

As a result of Dusty Rhodes winning the match, Tully Blanchard's valet, Baby Doll was forced to be Dusty Rhodes' valet for 30 days which sparked her face turn as she became a full-time valet for Rhodes and his then partner, Magnum T. A.

After the event, Buzz Tyler left JCP after a dispute with booker Dusty Rhodes and took the NWA Mid-Atlantic Heavyweight Championship belt with him. The Russian Team would lose the NWA World Tag Team titles to the debuting Rock & Roll Express three days later. Ric Flair would turn heel later in 1985 and join his (kayfabe) cousins Ole & Arn Anderson and break Dusty Rhodes' leg in a steel cage in September of that year, forcing him to surrender the NWA World Television title, and Flair/The Andersons would become the foundation of the Four Horsemen with Tully Blanchard and James J. Dillon joining in early 1986. Kamala would join the WWF later in 1985.

1986

The 1986 Great American Bash was the second annual Great American Bash event produced by the NWA's Jim Crockett Promotions (JCP). Instead of a singular event, JCP used "The Great American Bash" name for a tour that had several pay-per-view caliber shows around the country in the summer of 1986. There were a total of 13 shows held under this Great American Bash tour and NWA World Heavyweight Champion Ric Flair defended his title at each one against Ricky Morton, Road Warrior Hawk, Ron Garvin, Nikita Koloff, Robert Gibson, Road Warrior Animal, Magnum T. A., Wahoo McDaniel, and Dusty Rhodes. Rhodes defeated him for the title at the July 26 event. Flair challenged Rhodes to a rematch on the last Bash on August 2. Nikita Koloff and Magnum T. A. were involved in a best of seven title match series throughout the Bash for the U.S. Title. The cities toured in 1986 were in order as follows: July 1 in Philadelphia, July 3 in Washington, D.C., July 4 in Memphis, Tennessee, July 5 in Charlotte, North Carolina, July 8 in Charleston, WV, July 9 in Cincinnati, July 10 in Roanoke, Virginia, July 12 in Jacksonville, Florida, July 18 in Richmond, Virginia, July 21 in Fayetteville, North Carolina, July 23 in Johnson City, Tennessee, July 25 in Norfolk, Virginia, July 26 in Greensboro, North Carolina, and August 2 in Atlanta.

In July 2019, the July 5 and July 26 editions were uploaded as hidden gems on the WWE Network.

Steve Regal would win the NWA World Junior Heavyweight title from Denny Brown at the final Bash event in Atlanta, then lose it back to Brown a month later and join the WWF shortly afterwards. Ric Flair would regain the NWA World Heavyweight Title from Rhodes in St. Louis one week after the Bash tour ended, then Baby Doll would leave Dusty Rhodes and become Flair's valet until she was moved to the Central States territory after JCP's purchase later in 1986. Nikita Koloff would win the United States Heavyweight title after defeating Magnum T. A. for the fourth time on August 17 in Charlotte, NC, then would unify the United States title with the former Georgia National Heavyweight title by defeating champion Wahoo McDaniel in September 1986 (retiring the last of the former Georgia Championship Wrestling titles), then turn face after Magnum's career-ending car accident in October. Manny Fernandez would turn on Jimmy Valiant (Valiant would lose his hair later in the Bash tour) and become a heel, joining Paul Jones' army, later joining forces with Rick Rude. Ron Garvin would win the Mid-Atlantic Title from Black Bart in September before vacating the title (which then was retired) after winning the United States Tag Team titles with his partner Barry Windham.  

July 5, 1986 in Charlotte, North Carolina (Memorial Stadium)

July 26, 1986 in Greensboro, North Carolina (Greensboro Coliseum)

1987

The 1987 Great American Bash was the third annual Great American Bash event produced by the NWA's Jim Crockett Promotions (JCP). Like the previous year, it was a series of events held throughout the summer of 1987, although this year's tour only had three events instead of 13. This was the first use of the WarGames: The Match Beyond match conceived by Dusty Rhodes.

Rhodes was on the winning side in both events along with The Road Warriors, Nikita Koloff, and Paul Ellering. Koloff, Rhodes, and J. J. Dillon sustained serious injuries in the first encounter, which led to him being replaced in the 2nd WarGames match in Miami by The War Machine. The Bash series took place in numerous venues all July long, starting in Lakeland, Florida at the Lakeland Civic Center Arena on July 1. This was also the final wrestling event of the NWA's JCP to be aired live on closed-circuit television, as JCP began airing their wrestling events live on pay-per-view, starting with Starrcade in November 1987.

This was the first major card that included the UWF stars after JCP purchased the UWF in April, 1987 as well as Championship Wrestling from Florida, as JCP took over operations of the promotion as well.  Lazor-Tron (Hector Guerrero) would leave JCP later in 1987 and vacate the NWA World Junior Heavyweight Championship. The WWF national expansion continued as Big Bubba Rogers would leave later in 1987 to become the Big Boss Man, while other stars such as Chris Adams, Terry Gordy and Buddy Roberts would return to World Class (WCWA).  Dark Journey would leave JCP after the Bashes and retire from wrestling. Manny "The Ragin' Bull" Fernandez would go onto a short feud with Jimmy Garvin before leaving JCP later in 1987.  Tully Blanchard would lose his World TV title to Nikita Koloff, then he and Arn Anderson would form a tag team which captured the NWA World Tag Team titles (with a little unsolicited help from the Midnight Express) from the Rock & Roll Express in September 1987.  Dusty Rhodes would begin a feud with Lex Luger over the United States Heavyweight title.  Jimmy Garvin's valet (and real-life wife) Precious would have her "dream date" with Ric Flair (which turned out to be Garvin's brother Ron Garvin in drag) and Ron Garvin would rekindle his feud with Ric Flair over the NWA World Heavyweight Championship, which Garvin would win in Detroit, Michigan, on September 25, 1987.

July 4, 1987 in Atlanta, Georgia (The Omni)

July 18, 1987 in Charlotte, North Carolina (Memorial Stadium)

July 31, 1987 in Miami, Florida (Orange Bowl)

2012

The 2012 Great American Bash was the seventh Great American Bash professional wrestling event produced by WWE, and 21st Great American Bash event overall. Unlike previous editions of The Great American Bash, it was the first to air as a special episode of a regular WWE television program, as opposed to a pay-per-view event. The 2012 event was held as a special SuperSmackDown Live episode of SmackDown. It took place on July 3, 2012, at the American Bank Center in Corpus Christi, Texas. It was the first Great American Bash held since the 2009 event, which had been titled The Bash; the 2012 event returned to using the full name of "The Great American Bash". It was the final Great American Bash until 2020.

Battle Royal

Notes
   Slater and Swagger's eliminations occurred during a commercial break.

Notes

References

 
1985 establishments in the United States
Recurring events established in 1985
Recurring events disestablished in 2000
Recurring events established in 2004
Recurring events disestablished in 2009
Recurring events established in 2020